The district capital of Wayanad is Kalpetta town. Kalpetta has very good road connectivity with the rest of Kerala and neighboring South Indian cities. National Highway 766 (India) NH766 connects Kalpetta with Kozhikode and Mysore. State Highways connect Kalpetta with Ooty in Tamil Nadu and Madikeri in Karnataka.

Night Traffic Ban
En route to Mysore on NH 766, past Wayanad district boundary, which is also the Kerala state boundary, NH 766 passes through Bandipur National Park. There is a night traffic ban imposed on this stretch since 2009. The alternate road to take is, leave NH766 at Kalpetta and proceed to Mysore through Mananthavady, Kutta, Gonikoppal, and Hunsur. The authorities has announced new National Highway connecting Mysore with Malappuram via Gonikoppa, Kutta, Mananthavadi & Kalpetta. However there is a protest against this as part of protest against Night Travel ban in NH766 as this proposed Highway will be an alternative route but it may make NH766 closed forever in future and Sulthan Bathery will no longer have connection to Karnataka.

Road routes

Kalpetta – Mysore  (132 km): Sulthan Bathery – Gundlupet - Mysore(NH766)(Night travel not allowed)

Kalpetta – Mysore (115 km): Mananthavady – Bavali – Handpost (Heggadadevana kote) - Mysore(SH33) (Night travel not allowed) Bavali forest checkpost will be open only up to 6 PM.

Kalpetta – Mysore (159 km): Mananthavady - Kutta- Mysore (Night travel allowed) Road is bumpy.

Kalpetta – Ooty (127 km) : Meppadi – Gudalur

Kalpetta – Madikeri (135 km): Mananthavady - Kutta

Kalpetta - Kannur (123 km) : Mananthavady - Koothuparamba

Kalpetta - Malappuram (99 km) : Thamarassery - Areekkode - Manjeri

Kalpetta - Kozhikode (72 km) : Vythiri - Thamarassery

The authorities has announced new National Highway connecting Mysore with Malappuram via Gonikoppa, Kutta, Mananthavadi & Kalpetta.

Kalpetta
Kalpetta has very good road connectivity with the rest of Kerala and neighboring South Indian cities. NH 766 connects Kalpetta with Kozhikode and Mysore. State Highways connect Kalpetta with Ooty in Tamil Nadu and Madikeri in Karnataka.

Highways

All national and state highways passing through Wayanad District intersect at Kalpetta, making it a strategic location and the "Gateway of Wayanad":

National Highway NH 766 connects Kalpetta with Kozhikode in Kerala and Mysore in Karnataka. This highway is the primary access to Wayanad from the major cities of Kerala (Kozhikode, Kochi and Thiruvananthapuram) as well as Karnataka (Bangalore and Mysore).
State Highway SH 29 connects to the road to Gudalur and Ooty at the "Kerala - Tamil Nadu state border". This highway was originally Kozhikode - Vythiri - Kerala State border however the section Kozhikode - Chundale is now part of NH766. This highway now starts at Chundale, 6 km away from Kalpetta town-center.
State Highway SH 54 is an alternate road connecting Kalpetta with Kozhikode. This highway starts at Kalpetta and proceeds to Kozhikode through Padinjarethara, Poozhithode, Peruvannamuzhi, Perambra and Pavangad, Kozhikode. Note that the section Padinjarethara to Poozhithode is not yet laid as the environmental clearance to build the road through the forest is pending. This road is known as "Pinangode Road" at Kalpetta.

State Highway SH 59 Hill Highway (Kerala) - This proposed highway connects both ends of Kerala state, passing through entire hilly regions of the state. This highway will pass through Kalpetta, connecting Mananthavady to the North and Meppadi and Nilambur to the South. (The section Meppadi to Nilambur is to be built).

Night Traffic Ban on NH 766 at Bandipur National Park
En route to Mysore on NH 766, past Wayanad district boundary, which is also the Kerala state boundary, NH 766 passes through Bandipur National Park. There is a night traffic ban imposed on this stretch since 2009. The alternate road to take is, leave NH 766 at Kalpetta and proceed to Mysore through Mananthavady, Kutta, Gonikoppal, and Hunsur.

Road routes

Kalpetta – Bangalore (280 km): Sulthan Bathery – Gundlupet - Mysore(NH766)(Night travel not allowed)

Kalpetta – Bangalore (332 km): Mananthavady - Kutta- Mysore (Night travel allowed)

Kalpetta - Mysore : 130 km via Sulthan Bathery (NH766 - No Night Travel), 172 km via Mananthavady, Kutta (Use for Night Travel).

Kalpetta – Ooty (127 km) : Meppadi – Gudalur

Kalpetta – Madikeri (135 km): Mananthavady - Kutta

Kalpetta - Kannur (123 km) : Mananthavady - Koothuparamba

Kalpetta - Malappuram (99 km) : Thamarassery - Areekkode - Manjeri

Kalpetta - Kozhikode (72 km) : Vythiri - Thamarassery

Sultan Battery 
Sultan Battery has a very good road connectivity with south Indian states.  The major Road is NH 766 connected to Mysore, Bangalore and Kozhikode,  two State highways connected to Ooty and Coimbatore and a state highway connected to Mangalore, Kannur, Thalassery, Kasaragod and Malappuram.

Sulthan Bathery is the biggest transport hub of Wayanad district.  It is located near the border with the Karnataka state and Tamil Nadu state.  There is a  major Kerala Transport Depot in Sulthan Bathery.  Most of the long-distance buses  to  Kozhikode, Ooty and Bangalore start from this depot.  The town also has two smaller bus stations for local travellers.

Mananthavady

Mainly five Ghat roads are used for reaching Mananthavady from coastal towns and lower hilly towns of Kerala:

From Thalassery: Nedumpoil-Periya Ghat road, which connects Kasargod, Kannur, Thalassery and Kuthuparamba with Wayanad
 From Kozhikode: Thamarassery-Lakkidi Ghat road, part of NH 766, which connects Kozhikode and the rest of Kerala, south of Kozhikode with Wayanad
 From Vatakara: Kuttiady-Pakramthalam Ghat road, which connects Thalassery, Vatakara, Nadapuram, Kuttiady and Thottilpalam with Wayanad
 From Iritty: Kottiyoor-Ambayathode-Palchuram-Boys Town Ghat road, which connects lower hilly towns and villages of Kannur and Kasargod districts with Wayanad. The towns are Panathur, Vellarikundu, Chittarikkal, Udayagiri, Cherupuzha, Alakode, Sreekandapuram, Payyavoor, Iritty, Peravoor, Kelakam, Kottiyoor, etc.
 From Nilambur: Vazhikkadavu-Nadukani Ghat road, which connects Nilambur, Palakkad, Thrissur and Malappuram, with Wayanad.

References

Roads in Wayanad district